Nautilus Mountain is a  summit in British Columbia, Canada.

Description

Nautilus Mountain is located in the Battle Range of the Selkirk Mountains. Precipitation runoff from the mountain drains into tributaries of the Duncan River. Nautilus Mountain is notable for its steep rise above local terrain and for its absolute elevation.

History

The landform is named for the Nautilus, a fictional submarine belonging to Captain Nemo in Jules Verne's 1870 novel Twenty Thousand Leagues Under the Seas. The peak is named in association with nearby Mount Nemo, which in turn was named by Sterling B. Hendricks in 1947. The mountain's toponym was officially adopted on November 1, 1963, by the Geographical Names Board of Canada.

The first ascent of the summit was made in 1959 by Samuel Silverstein and party.

Climate

Based on the Köppen climate classification, Nautilus Mountain is located in a subarctic climate zone with cold, snowy winters, and mild summers. Winter temperatures can drop below −20 °C with wind chill factors below −30 °C. This climate supports the Nemo Glacier on the north slope of the peak and an unnamed icefield on the east slope.

See also
Geography of British Columbia

Gallery

References

External links
 Nautilus Mountain: Weather forecast

Three-thousanders of British Columbia
Selkirk Mountains
Kootenay Land District